"Our Goodman" (Child 274, Roud 114) is a Scottish and English humorous folk song. It describes the efforts of an unfaithful wife to explain away the evidence of her infidelity. A version of the song, "Seven Drunken Nights", was a hit record for The Dubliners in the 1960s.

History and content
The song appeared in David Herd's 1776 compilation Ancient and Modern Scottish Songs. In it a husband (goodman) comes home to find a strange horse there. When he asks his wife what the horse is doing there she calls him stupid and blind, and says that it is a milk cow her mother sent her. The man retorts that in all his travels he never saw a saddle on a cow.

On subsequent evenings he comes home to find other strange items, such as boots, a sword and a coat, for which his wife gives him equally far-fetched explanations. Finally, he goes to bed, where he finds a "sturdy man", who his wife tells him is a new milkmaid her mother sent her, to which he replies that "long-bearded maidens I saw never nane."

Another version appeared in R. A. Smith's 1823 collection, The Scotish  Minstrel, as "Hame Cam Our Gudeman at E'en" ("Home came the husband at evening"). The early verses of this are much the same as in the Herd version, but in the final verse the husband finds a highland plaid, which reveals the stranger to be a refugee from the Jacobite Wars:

Francis James Child, in The English And Scottish Popular Ballads (1882), noted the version published by Herd (which he called A), and a different version (B) called "The Merry Cuckold and the Kind Wife", which was published as a broadside in London. In this version the cuckold, named as "Old Wichet", comes home to find, not one, but three horses, swords, boots etc.:

Child gives the first lines as:

Another, quite different version, called "Marion", was popular in France and Italy.

The Roud Folk Song Index has over 400 versions of the song, with titles such as "Merry Cuckold", "Old Witchet", "Three Nights Drunk" and "Seven Nights Drunk". Steve Roud and Julia Bishop described it as "an immensely widespread song, probably known all over the English-speaking world, with the wording varying considerably but the structure and basic story remaining the same." Bertrand Harris Bronson listed 58 versions for which tunes exist; he found considerable variety in the tunes, which he divided into eight groups. John E. Housman observed that "There is much of Chaucer's indomitable gaiety in this ballad. The questions of the jealous husband and the evasions of his wife are treated here in a humorous vein".

A version of the song called "Seven Drunken Nights" was a hit single for Irish folk group The Dubliners in 1967, reaching No. 7 on the UK Singles Chart.

A Danish version of the song featured in the historical drama series 1864, where it was sung by soldiers before a battle. It followed Child's B version ("Three Guards' horses stood in a row / And one and two and three").

A Russian version, called "The Drunk Cowboy", was recorded in 2003 by Alexander Tkachev. It consists of five parts, at the end of each the wife tells the cowboy to go to sleep. The days include a horse (cow, saddled) a hat (chamberpot, from straw), pants (rags, with a zipper), a stranger's head (cabbage with a moustache), and, finally, a baby which doesn't look like the cowboy's (a log, but one which pees).

Recordings

References

Child Ballads
Scottish folk songs
Year of song unknown